Niccolò Rinaldi (Florence, 3 December 1962) is an Italian politician, writer and alpinist.

In 2009 he was elected at the European Parliament with Italia dei Valori as independent. He is member of the ALDE group, of which he has been, since 2000 and until the election, general secretary adjunct. He is currently vice president for the group. He is also head of delegation for IDV (Italia dei Valori) at the European Parliament.

Career
Born in Florence in 1962, he graduated in Political Science with a dissertation on the "road economy" in Dakar, which was the result of a "field research" in Senegal. He was responsible for the information at the UN in Afghanistan. He lived in Peshawar (Pakistan's turbulent city on the border with Afghanistan), Kabul and in the rest of the country. Afghanistan has been a harsh and exciting period but, above all, a school of life so important for his personal growth that he wrote some books about it. In 1991 he left the United Nations and he started working at the European Parliament, as political adviser. In 2000 he became one of the Secretaries General of the Parliament. In 2009 he was elected MEP with Italia dei Valori as independent. He is now Vice-President for ALDE (Alliance of Liberals and Democrats for Europe) and IDV Head of Delegation in the European Parliament.

He is a great promoter of voluntary work, which he has been doing for a long time, especially to help disabled people. He has a passion for mountains. On the peak of Monte Bianco he shot a video on the territorial conflict between Italy and France. and he is a member of the Tuscan sky rescue service and of Italian Alpine Club. He is also co-founder and member of the board of the fair trade cooperative Equoland.

Niccolò Rinaldi is also a member of the Italian Journalists Association.
After Antonio Di Pietro's resignation, Niccolò Rinaldi decide to run for the national secretariat of Italy of Values during the Extraordinary Congress (28-28–30 June 2013). Even if he was the favourite candidate at the polls, especially after other candidates' (Borghesi, Castellarin, Scalera who withdrew their candidacy) convergence to his motion and Gianni Vattimo's blessing, he will not be elected, despite having submitted a most radical and innovative proposal for  IDV's secretariat"

Political Activity 
As an MEP, Niccolò Rinaldi has done a lot to spread the knowledge in Italy about the opportunities offered by European funds and how to successfully apply to the calls. In order to do so, he put into place a lot of initiatives, such as a newsletter which gives information about the calls´ deadlines, a book about European funds which is freely downloadable from his website, the organization of many conferences on this subject for the local civil servants, and so on.  

As a member of the Committee on International Trade (INTA), he manages a lot of dossiers on international trade: for example, he is rapporteur for the FTA with Malesia, the FTA EU-India (safeguard clause), for the special conditions for trade with those areas of Cyprus in which its government does not exercise effective control and for the exercise of the Union's rights for the application and enforcement of international trade rules. 

He is very concerned about the problems and every-day-life difficulties of the people who are more fragile and often less protected by the social system, such as immigrants, disabled people, Roma people. He is also very interested in the topic of "collective memory", about which organized many initiatives: for example, the production of multimedia installations on the siege of towns ("Piazza di guerra", 2003), and on the Rwandan genocide ("Silence for Rwanda", 2004) and the writing of a book on the Holocaust.

Publications 

Niccolò Rinaldi, Islam, guerra e dintorni. Viaggio in Afghanistan, Turin, ed. L'Harmattan Italia, 1997, with a preface by Jas Gawronski. This book has been translated in French, too: Niccolò Rinaldi, Dieu, guerre et autres paysages, Paris, L´Harmanattan France, 2000, with a preface by Daniel Cohn-Bendit.

Niccolò Rinaldi, Droga di Dio. Afghanistan: la società dei credenti, Naples, ed. L´Ancora del Mediterraneo, 2002.

Niccolò Rinaldi, Firenze, Herat e la forza di Kabul, racconto pubblicato in Imago Mundi: Piazza di Guerra, Florence, ed. Festina Lente, 2003.

Niccolò Rinaldi, L'invenzione dell'Africa. Un viaggio, un dizionario, Molfetta, ed. La Meridiana, 2005.

Niccolò Rinaldi, Piccola anatomia di un genocidio - Auschwitz e oltre, Florence, ed. Giuntina, 2009.

Niccolò Rinaldi, L'Europa in 12 poeti di libertà, Florence, ed. Festina Lente, 2010.

Niccolò Rinaldi, Dei finanziamenti europei: istruzioni per l'uso, Florence, ed. Festina Lente, 2010.

Niccolò Rinaldi, Una storia per numeri - La NON Europa dell'Italia, Florence, ed. Festina Lente, 2010.

Niccolò Rinaldi, "Album d'Italia: cartoline di IdV Estero per i 150 anni dell'unità" ed. Festina Lente 2011.

Niccolò Rinaldi, "Firenze insolita e segreta", ed.Jonglez, 2011 (available also in English, French and Spanish).

Niccolò Rinaldi, "Oceano Arno - i Navigatori fiorentini", ed. Firenze Libri, 2012.

Niccolò Rinaldi, "Ricettario di cucina europea in tempo di crisi", ed. Festina Lente, 2012.

See also 
 European Parliament
 Italia dei Valori

References

External links
 Website
EP

1962 births
Living people
MEPs for Italy 2009–2014
21st-century Italian politicians
Italian expatriates in Pakistan